Dundonnell (Gaelic: Achadh Dà Dhòmhnaill) is a village in Ross and Cromarty, Scotland, on the south side of Little Loch Broom and at the foot of An Teallach, right at the north of the area commonly known as the "Great Wilderness".

Dundonnell gives its name to the Dundonnell River, which flows into Little Loch Broom at its estuary just north-west of the village.

There is an independent youth hostel, a farm and a hotel. Many semi-wild sheep roam the area, which is the most inland point of the loch. The Ardessie Falls pour into the loch nearby. Local wildlife includes cormorants, lesser black-backed gulls and song thrushes.

References

Populated places in Ross and Cromarty

 2. https://en.wikipedia.org/wiki/Ardessie Ardessie wikipedia page